Gahnia australis is a tussock-forming perennial in the family Cyperaceae, that is native to southern western parts of Western Australia.

References

australis
Plants described in 1980
Flora of Western Australia
Taxa named by Karen Louise Wilson